The 2014 CARIFTA Games were held from April 19–21, 2014 at the Stade Pierre Aliker in Fort-de-France, Martinique.  A detailed report of the event was given for the IAAF.

For the first time, the youth competition was open for athletes aged under-18 rather than under-17.  The event served as regional trials for the athletics competitions at the 2014 Summer Youth Olympics.

Austin Sealy Award
The Austin Sealy Trophy for the most outstanding athlete of the games was awarded to Akela Jones, Barbados.  She won three gold medals (100 m hurdles, high jump, and long jump) in the junior (U-20) category.

Records
By default, all winning marks in the U-18 category were new championship records, because the category was newly introduced substituting the U-17 category.  However, only the marks that improved the existent U-17 records are considered here.

Key

Medal summary
Medal winners were published.

Boys U-20 (Junior)

†: Open event for both junior and youth athletes.

Girls U-20 (Junior)

†: Open event for both junior and youth athletes.
*: Using youth implements.

Boys U-18 (Youth)

‡: The result of the initial boy's U-18 100m final race was cancelled after problems at the start.  The athletes complained that they heard two shots when starting.  Therefore, the race was re run one day later.

Girls U-18 (Youth)

Medal table (unofficial)
The originally published official medal table differs slightly from the unofficial count displayed below in bronze medals (and consequently in the total number of medals) for Jamaica (+1), the Bahamas (-1), and Saint Lucia (-1) triggering some discussion.  The medal count below was confirmed by a careful re-evaluation of the published results.  Corrected medal numbers in accordance with those below for Jamaica and the Bahamas were published.

Participation
According to an unofficial count, athletes from 25 countries participated.

/

/

 Haïti

/

References

External links
Official webpage (archived)
Complete results (archived)
Facebook

CARIFTA Games
CARIFTA Games
CARIFTA Games
CARIFTA Games
CARIFTA Games
2014 in Caribbean sport